Mikołaj Mielecki h. Gryf (ca. 1540 – 11 May 1585 in Kraków) was a Polish nobleman and politician. Since 1569 Mielecki was the voivod of Podolian Voivodship, between 1578 and 1580 he also served in the Polish Army as the Grand Hetman of the Crown.

Biography 
One of the most notable partisans of the Habsburg faction in Poland, since 1562 he took part in various military campaigns to Moldavia under command of Mikołaj Sieniawski. In 1579 he was the commander of all Polish armies in the war against Ivan the Terrible, Grand Duke of Muscovy. One of his most astonishing successes was capturing the city and the stronghold of Połock. Following various disagreements with Stefan Batory and Jan Zamoyski he resigned his posts and retired from public life.

Initially a lukewarm Calvinist and a member of the Polish Reformed Church, in the late 1570s he converted to Catholicism, with his wife and children following him a few years later.

Marriage and issue 
Mikołaj married  Elżbieta Radziwiłł, the daughter of Hetman Mikołaj Czarny Radziwiłł in 1566 and had two children:

 Zofia Mielecka (1566-1619), married to Prince Szymon Olelkowicz Słucki and later to Hetman Jan Karol Chodkiewicz
 Katarzyna Mielecka (born ca. 1568), married to Jan Ostroróg, voivode of Poznań

Bibliography
 Jan Łasicki. Historia de ingressu Polonorum in Valachiam cum Bogdano Voivoda et caede Turcarum: ducibus Nicolao Mielecio et Nicolao Sieniawscio: A. 1572 
 Ryszard Przybyliński. Hetman wielki koronny Mikołaj Mielecki (ok. 1540-1585). Toruń 2002. 
 Marcin Spórna. Słownik najsłynniejszych wodzów i dowódców polskich. Kraków 2006.

References

16th-century Polish nobility
Great Crown Hetmans
1585 deaths
French Roman Catholics
Converts to Roman Catholicism from Calvinism
Polish people of the Livonian campaign of Stephen Báthory
Polish Roman Catholics
Year of birth unknown
Mikolaj